Phu Hin Rong Kla National Park is a national park located in the Loei and Phitsanulok Provinces of Thailand. The protected area is located in the forested mountains of the Luang Prabang Range close to the border with Laos and is part of the Luang Prabang montane rain forests ecoregion. The park was the base of operations of the long fight of Thai combatant in communist war of Thailand.

Geography
There are four types of forest, namely mixed deciduous forest, dry dipterocarp forest, hill evergreen forest and conifer forest. There are many streams such as: Huai Lam Nam Sai and Huai Luang Yai.

History
Between 1968 and 1972, the area was the scene of fighting between Thai communist insurgents and the Royal Thai Armed Forces. Due to the difficult terrain, it was initially impossible to achieve success against the communists and tactics had to be changed. The military were able to convince the Hmong community present around the area to cooperate with the Thai government. This worked out perfectly and the communist insurgents surrendered without further bloodshed.

A survey was set up of Phu Hin Rong Kla forest in the area of Bo Pho subdistrict, Noen Phoem subdistrict and Ban Yaeng subdistrict, Nakhon Thai district, Phitsanulok province and Kok Ssathon subdistrict, Dan Sai district, Loei province in February 1983. Later the Royal Forest Department proposed to include Phu Hin Rong Kla in the system of national parks on March 15, 1983. Phu Hin Rong Kla was declared the 48th national park on July 26, 1984. Since 2002 this national park has been managed by Protected Areas Regional Office 11 (Phitsanulok)

Climate
The park is generally cool all year round, with temperatures rarely rising above .  The temperature occasionally drops below freezing.

Flora

Plant species include:

Orchids species include:

Fauna
At the present, humans come and settle down so there are less wild animals in the national park.
The number of sightings in the park are:
Nine species of mammels, include:

The park has some 260 species of birds, of which some 190 species of passerine from 42 families, represented by one species:

and some 70 species of non-passerine from 21 families, represented by one species:

Eighteen species of reptiles from four families, represented by one species:

Fifteen species of amphibians from five families, represented by one species:

Places
 Lan Hin Taek (ลานหินแตก) - a big broken stone sheet that looks similar to splitting land. It is covered with orchids, ferns, mosses, lichens and seasonal flowers.
 Lan Hin Pum (ลานหินปุ่ม) - natural rock formations.
 Namtok Man Daeng (น้ำตกหมันแดง) - a 32-tiered waterfall of the Man creek that flows throughout the year.
 Namtok Romklao and Pharadon (น้ำตกร่มเกล้า-ภราดร) - waterfalls.
 Namtok Pha Lat and Tat Fa (น้ำตกผาลาด-ตาดฟ้า) - waterfalls.
 Namtok Huai Khamin Noi (น้ำตกห้วยขมิ้นน้อย) - a waterfall
 Pha Chu Thong (พาชูธง) - a cliff
 Thailand-Communism museum.

Effect of human presence
Much of the forest was damaged and much of the wildlife was killed or fled to safer areas during a period when the region was used as a battlefield between the Thai government and the communists.

Location

See also
 List of national parks in Thailand
 List of Protected Areas Regional Offices of Thailand

References

National parks of Thailand
Phetchabun Mountains
Ministry of Natural Resources and Environment (Thailand)
Tourist attractions in Phitsanulok province
Protected areas established in 1984
1984 establishments in Thailand

External links